Filiberto Mercado (born 28 June 1938) is a former Mexican cyclist. He competed in the individual road race and team time trial events at the 1960 Summer Olympics.

References

External links
 

1938 births
Living people
Mexican male cyclists
Olympic cyclists of Mexico
Cyclists at the 1960 Summer Olympics
Sportspeople from Pachuca